Kulittalai Kadambavaneswarar Temple (குளித்தலை கடம்பவனேஸ்வரர் கோயில்) is a Hindu temple located at  Karur district of Tamil Nadu, India. The presiding deity is Shiva. He is called as Kadambavaneswarar.  His consort is Mutrila Mulaiammai.

Significance 
It is one of the shrines of the 275 Paadal Petra Sthalams. Thirunavukkarasar have sung hymns in praise of the temple. It is believed that Shiva appeared for sage Kanva in the Kadamba forest and hence the place came to be known as Kadambanthurai. It is also counted among the many temples on the banks of river Cauvery.

References

External links 
 
 

Hindu temples in Karur district
Padal Petra Stalam